Phytophthora gallica is an oomycete. It produces globose and elongated irregular chlamydospores.

References

Water mould plant pathogens and diseases
gallica